Poznań Fara, also known as the Parish Church or simply Fara, is a Roman Catholic basilica located in the heart of the Old Town district in Poznań, western Poland. It is one of the city's most recognizable landmarks, the most important Christian temple alongside the Cathedral and the finest example of Baroque architecture in Poland. The full name of the Church is Basilica of Our Lady of Perpetual Help, Mary Magdalene and Saint Stanislaus. It is currently part of the Roman Catholic Archdiocese of Poznań.

Built between 1651 and 1701, the structure was engineered by Polish and Italian masters in the Baroque style, who also incorporated Roman architectural aspects such as the monumental Corinthian columns in the interior. In the mid-18th century Pompeo Ferrari designed the main altar standing at 17 meters in height and the main entrance from the Old Town. In 1876 an organ constructed by Friedrich Ladegast was installed inside the Church. The Fara, like most of the city, was spared from destruction during World War II.

History
In 1570 Bishop Adam Konarski brought the Jesuits to Poznań, who were given permission to occupy the former Church of Saint Stanislaus. In 1651, the construction of a new temple began and the plans of which were probably sent from Rome (traditionally the author of the project was Bartłomiej Nataniel Wąsowski - rector of the Jesuit College in Poznań and theoretician of architecture). Initial work (until 1652) was directed by Italian-born Tomasz Poncino. The Swedish Deluge (1655-1660) suspended the work. In 1705, the Fara was consecrated, despite the Church being incomplete. In the years 1727-1732 Pompeo Ferrari remodelled the main entry and the interior, thus bringing the final phase of construction to an end.

Following the 1773 fire and the 1780 collapse of the nearby Mary Magdalene Collegiate Church, the Fara became the new seat of the Poznań clergy. In 1913 the whole complex was renovated; the work was cut short by World War I. During the Invasion of Poland and World War II, the Fara was spared but stripped of its rich ornaments and turned into a warehouse by the Wehrmacht. War damage was cleared by 1950.

Legend
According to a popular legend, a woman in black appears on the hardly-accessible organ balcony. The ghost was sighted on many occasions, which was often featured in media and news coverage. The woman is said to have donated a large sum to purchase the organ in the 1870s and is guarding the instrument.

Gallery

See also
 List of Jesuit sites

References

External links

Fara
Tourist attractions in Poznań
Baroque architecture in Poland
The Most Holy Virgin Mary, Queen of Poland